Leucine rich repeat containing 61 is a protein that in humans is encoded by the LRRC61 gene.

References

Further reading